Kovanur is a village in the Kumbakonam taluk of Thanjavur district, Tamil Nadu, India.

Demographics 

As per the 2001 census, Kovanur had a total population of 2,161 with 1,094 males and 1,067 females. The sex ratio was 975. The literacy rate was 78.22.

References 

 

Villages in Thanjavur district